was a Japanese former Nippon Professional Baseball player and manager. In his first few years as a major league player, Tamiya was utilized as a pitcher and first baseman, but in the prime of his career, he was an outfielder. He was inducted into the Japanese Baseball Hall of Fame in 2002.

Early life 
Tamiya was born in Shimodate, Ibaraki and attended Shimodate Shogyo High School. Tamiya also attended Nihon University, where he won a Tokyo Metropolitan University League batting title in 1947, before dropping out.

Professional career 
Tamiya first started for the Osaka Tigers of the Japanese Baseball League, as a pitcher and, occasionally, a first baseman. On March 16, 1950, he almost threw the first perfect game in Nippon Professional Baseball history, coming within one out, before Sakae Nakamura got a hit that ended the bid. A shoulder injury in 1952 would see him move to the outfield, where he spent the rest of his career. As a Tiger, Tamiya won the Best Nine Award 3 times, in 1956, 1957, and 1958. He also led the league in slugging percentage and triples in 1957, as well as batting average and triples in 1958. Tamiya would sign with the Daimai Orions in 1959 and immediately tied as league leader in doubles with Kazuhiro Yamauchi. He would win the Best Nine Award two more times, in 1960 and 1961. He retired in 1963. He is one of only six NPB players who have hit 100 homers and pitched a win.

Managerial career 
In 1969, Tamiya became a hitting coach for the Chunichi Dragons, but, in the next year, he became the manager of the Toei Flyers, and led for three years, finishing with a record of 155–209–21 as the Flyer's skipper. In 1995 and 1996, he was the manager for the Chinese Professional Baseball League team Wei Chuan Dragons and finished with a record of 83–104–3.

Later life and death 
Tamiya would serve as a council member for his hometown, Shimodate. He died on May 5, 2010, at the age of 82 due to brain hemorrhage.

References 

1928 births
2010 deaths
Japanese baseball players
Nippon Professional Baseball pitchers
Nippon Professional Baseball outfielders
Osaka Tigers players
Daimai Orions players
Managers of baseball teams in Japan
Hokkaido Nippon-Ham Fighters managers
Japanese sportsperson-politicians
Wei Chuan Dragons managers
Japanese Baseball Hall of Fame inductees